Rajoir is an upazila of Madaripur District in the Division of Dhaka, Bangladesh.

Geography
It has 37746 households and total area 229.29 km2.

Demographics
As of the 1991 Bangladesh census, Rajoir has a population of 204356. Males constitute 50.3% of the population, and females 49.7%. This Upazila's eighteen up population is 99620. Rajoir has an average literacy rate of 28.5% (7+ years), and the national average of 32.4% literate.

Administration
Rajoir Upazila is divided into 11 union parishads: Amgram, Badar Pasha, Bajitpur, Haridasdi Mahendradi, Hosainpur, Isibpur, Kabirajpur, Kadambari, Khalia, Paik Para, and Rajoir. The union parishads are subdivided into 95 mauzas and 187 villages.

Education

According to Banglapedia, Aruakandi-Natakhola-Barakhola High School, founded in 1963, is a notable secondary school.

See also
 Upazilas of Bangladesh
 Districts of Bangladesh
 Divisions of Bangladesh

References

 
Upazilas of Madaripur District